The United States Army Transportation Corps S160 Class is a class of  2-8-0 Consolidation steam locomotive, designed for heavy freight work in Europe during World War II. A total of 2,120 were built and they worked on railroads across much of the world, including Africa, Asia, all of Europe and South America.

Design

During the 1930s, the United States Army Transportation Corps approved an update of a Baldwin Locomotive Works World War I design, to be used, if required, for war transportation. The result was the S159 Class loco. During the early period of World War II, when America was neutral, the government of Franklin D. Roosevelt approved the Lend-Lease supply to the United Kingdom of the S200 Class, designed specifically to fit into the restricted British loading gauge.

With America's entry to World War II, the USATC needed a developed design from which a large number of locomotives could be constructed to run on the wrecked railways of Europe, deploying military hardware and civilian goods. Hence, the development of the S160 Class, designed by Maj. J. W. Marsh from the Railway Branch of the Corps of Engineers, which drew on previous locomotives, using austerity principles, and was built using methods which allowed for efficient and fast construction, and a long life, including axlebox grease lubricators, and rolled plates in preference to castings.

With cast frames (a few had frames which were flame-cut from rolled steel slabs) and cast wheels, the front two driving axles were sprung independently from the rear two driving axles, to cater for running on poor-quality track. The larger tender layout was derived from the similar design of the British WD Austerity 2-8-0, with an inset coal bunker above the water tank to improve visibility when running backwards.

Construction

British deployment
800 locomotives were constructed in 1942/3 in thirteen batches, split between ALCO, Baldwin and Lima Locomotive Works. Shipped to South Wales and dispatched from the GWR locomotive depot at Newport, Ebbw Junction, the first 43 locomotives were transferred to the LNER Doncaster Works for completion, and later running in over the East Coast Main Line. This started a pattern whereby each of the four British railway companies eventually deployed a total of 400 S160's under the guise of "running in," but factually replacing damaged stock and increasing the capacity of the British railway system to allow for shipping of military pre-invasion equipment and troops. The eventual deployment of S160's were:

174 to the Great Western Railway
168 to the London and North Eastern Railway
50 to the London, Midland and Scottish Railway
6 to the Southern Railway

The second batch of 400 S160's were prepared for storage by USATC personnel at the Great Western's Ebbw Junction locomotive depot in the immediate run-up to D-Day.  After the D-Day invasion of Normandy, the locomotives deployed across Britain again began to be collected and be refurbished at Ebbw Junction in preparation for shipment to Europe.

Operational failures
The S160's were designed for quick and efficient building, not long-term operations, thus compromises in design led to some difficulties in operation. The axle-box grease-lubricators were not very efficient, particularly when maintenance procedures lapsed or were delayed for operational war reasons, and so axle-boxes often ran hot. Braking was poor by modern standards, with a Westinghouse steam brake used for the locomotive, which was woefully insufficient, due to the long distance from the driver's valve to the brake cylinder.

A major fault of the S160 was use of a single water gauge of a Klinger design, unfamiliar to U.K. crews; it was necessary to open the top and bottom cocks slowly or the check valves would close, trapping water in the gauge and giving a false reading. If the valves were not fully open, the crews could be misled into thinking that the water level was adequate, even though it was becoming dangerously low. When a low water condition allowed the crown sheet to overheat, the stay bolts holding the crown sheet would fail with little warning, resulting in a boiler explosion. In a space of ten months, three UK S160s suffered a collapse of the firebox crown, with the first leading to the death of a GWR fireman on No. 2403 in November 1943. Although there are claims that the stay bolts or firebox design were less than for domestic locomotive boilers, the locomotives were equipped with a "boiler built to comply in all aspects with the A.S.M.E. Boiler Code,  except that the shell shall have a factor safety of 4."

Deployment
Judging accurately the actual deployment of 2120 locomotives is difficult, but the following numbers are referenced:

Europe
The British locomotives, together with those shipped direct from America were also similarly deployed first with troops reclaiming Europe, and then subsumed throughout European national railways as replacements for their destroyed stock after the war:

Austria, ÖBB class 956 – 30 examples, all scrapped
Czechoslovakia, ČSD class 456.1 – 80 examples, last of them (456.173) withdrawn in 1972 and scrapped the following year
France, SNCF class 140U – 121 examples, all passed on to other countries by 1947;
Germany – 40 examples briefly used in 1947 in American and British zones, based in Bremen. All sold to Hungary in August 1947;
Greece, class Θγ (THg) – 27 examples received in 1947 (Θγ 521 to 537 and Θγ 551 to 560), plus 25 examples bought from Italian FS railways in 1959 (Θγ 571 to 595);
Hungary, MÁV class 411 – 510 examples, bought at $10 000 for coal-fired ones, and $10 000, $16 000 or $20 000 for oil-fired ones, depending on condition. 484 were put into service with road numbers from 411,001 through 411,484. A further 26 were cannibalized for spares;
Italy, FS class 736 – 244 examples, plus four salvaged from a sunken ship, all but eight with oil firing. 25 sold to Greece in 1959, the rest were withdrawn in early 1960s
Poland, PKP class Tr201 – PKP received 75 S160s from UNRRA and numbered them Tr201-1 through 75; a further 500 arrived from the USATC as class Tr203, numbered Tr203-1 through 500. Modifications included fitting Trofimov piston valves, electric headlights and cab side doors. One engine was converted to a Tank locomotive in 1957, and designated class TKr55
Soviet Union, Class ШA (ShA) – 200 machines ordered from Baldwin (ШA 1 to 90) and ALCO (ШA 91 to 200), designated S162s and S166s. ШA 52 to 55, 69 and 70 were lost en route to Vladivostok and ШA 13 remained in the USA. In 1957, 50 of them were for  track and used by the southern Sakhalin Railway
Spain, class 553 – in 1958 the Alaska Railroad sold six S160's to the Ferrocarril de Langreo
Turkey, TCDD class 45171 – 50 units, numbered 45171 to 45220
United Kingdom – none in use with any of the mainline railways after World War II, as almost all were exported post D-Day. However, one was kept back by the British Army, ALCO-built works number 71512, and used at the Longmoor Military Railway as WD 93257 "Carl R Gray Jr" until it was scrapped in 1957. Some have now been re-imported for use by preserved railways.
Yugoslavia, JŽ class 37 - 80 examples.

Africa
At the same time as S160s were being deployed into Britain, when General Patton led American troops in Operation Torch into the North African Campaign, their Transport Corps brought the S160s with them. These locomotives moved across the north of the continent as Patton's troops waged war, and when the troops moved to Italy the majority of their S160s moved up with them. These locomotives, supplemented with those directly imported from America, were eventually to create a group of 243 locomotives, subsumed by the Italian State Railway's to become the FS Class 736 class.

Algeria, class 140-U – number unknown
Morocco, class 140-B – number unknown
Tunisia, class 140-250 – number unknown

Americas

Mexico, although it has been claimed that class GR-28 – 10 examples purchased by FCM directly from Baldwin in 1946 and allocated service numbers 211 to 220, were derived from the S-160, unlike an S-160 the spacing of the third and fourth driver is wider than between the other two, driver diameter is given as 60 inch vs 57 inch, and bore and stroke are 22X28 vs 19X26.
Peru, class 80 – 2 examples, with different couplers, probably directly from ALCO in 1943
United States – an unknown number with USATC and then various military transportation units. Five surplus to requirements of the Alaska Railroad later shipped to Spain

Asia
Under the United Nations Relief and Rehabilitation Administration, a number of S160s were deployed to China and South Korea. In addition to this, a 1944 batch of 60 from Baldwin were sent to India and locally assembled.

 China, KD6 class – number unknown. Many were modernized with larger cabs, higher stacks, some fitted with large smoke lifters with horizontal riffles. They were later transferred to industrial operators, mainly coal mines. The last example was withdrawn in the late 1990s, with 2 surviving; 463 & 487.
 North Korea, 8000 series - number unknown. The DPRK's S160s came from the Soviet Union and China, starting almost immediately following the end of the Second World War, and the Korean State Railway eventually numbered them in the 8000 series. Ironically, the S160's were used by both North and South Korean forces during this conflict.
 South Korea, 소리2 (Sori2) class, 소리2-1 — 소리2-100. 100 S160s were delivered to the Korean National Railroad in 1947. In KNR service they were used primarily in yard duty and occasional short local trains, but they were not popular with Korean locomotive crews, as they were right-hand drive on a left-running railway.
 India, class AWC – 60 locomotives were sent to India in kit form for local assembly as  broad gauge engines. Originally allocated USATC numbers 3433–3492 (Baldwin 70390–70449, 1944) they had their running numbers increased by 3000 by the Indian authorities to avoid numbers in use by the local railway companies. They were split between the East Indian Railway and the South Indian Railway; at the all-India renumbering scheme the former EIR locomotives became 22601–22614, and SIR locomotives became 22615–22660. Forty-five were still in service as of June 1977.

Class designation

Although "S160" has been popularly adopted as the class identification for this design of War Department Consolidation, it can not be verified as an official designation despite considerable research. The S160 designation is not found in 1942 and 1943 Baldwin drawing indexes, the Lima drawing index for the class, nor in meeting minutes in which representatives of the War Department and the three builders made several design decisions prior to production. It is also not found in any of approximately 900 engineering drawings which are still in existence. The Baldwin designation for the design, 2-8-0-19S, is found in their drawing indexes, on some drawings, and is stamped onto major locomotive components on examples built by Baldwin.

Variants
There were several major variants of the S160 class, excluding in-life design development:
S161 - designed for deployment in Jamaica on British military railways used by the United States. Later subsumed by the Jamaica Railway Corporation
S162 and S166 - both designed for Russian five foot broad gauge track.
Sixty  broad gauge examples were constructed for use in India in 1944 as part of an order for 180 locomotives which also include one locomotive configured to Alaska Railroad specifications. 
There were several variations in equipment from the "standard" design for the War Department Consolidations, depending on the user. Typically, European-style buffers and couplers and kerosene lighting were fitted. Examples for India, the U.S.S.R., at least six purchased new for the Alaska Railroad, and possibly approximately 10 which remained on U.S. Army bases were fitted with turbo-generators and electric lighting. The six purchased new for the Alaska Railroad were also fitted by Baldwin with U.S. style automatic couplers, bells, power reverse, and U.S. style pilots. Some later production had screw type reverse gear. The War Department also required that the locomotives could be configured to burn either coal or oil.

Preservation
Mainly due to their numbers, rather than the design or build quality, at least 26 examples of the S160 have survived into preservation, making them one of the most numerous survivors of all Mainline Steam Locomotives:

References

External links

 
2-8-0 locomotives
S160
ALCO locomotives
Baldwin locomotives
Lima locomotives
Railway locomotives introduced in 1942
Freight locomotives
5 ft 6 in gauge locomotives
Standard gauge locomotives of Hungary
Standard gauge locomotives of the United States
Standard gauge locomotives of China
Standard gauge locomotives of Poland
Standard gauge locomotives of Greece
Standard gauge locomotives of Turkey
Standard gauge locomotives of Italy
Standard gauge steam locomotives of Great Britain
Standard gauge locomotives of Austria
Standard gauge locomotives of Czechoslovakia
Standard gauge locomotives of France
Standard gauge locomotives of Germany
Standard gauge locomotives of Yugoslavia
Standard gauge locomotives of Algeria
Standard gauge locomotives of Morocco
Standard gauge locomotives of Tunisia
Standard gauge locomotives of Mexico
Standard gauge locomotives of Peru
Standard gauge locomotives of North Korea
Standard gauge locomotives of South Korea
Steam locomotives of Hungary
Steam locomotives of the United States
Steam locomotives of China
Steam locomotives of Poland
Steam locomotives of Greece
Steam locomotives of Turkey
Steam locomotives of Italy
Steam locomotives of Great Britain
Steam locomotives of Austria
Steam locomotives of Czechoslovakia
Steam locomotives of France
Steam locomotives of Germany
Steam locomotives of Yugoslavia
Steam locomotives of Tunisia
Steam locomotives of South Korea
Steam locomotives of India
Steam locomotives of the Soviet Union
Steam locomotives of Spain
1′D h2 locomotives

it:Locomotiva FS 736